St. Lewis (Fox Harbour) Airport  is adjacent to St. Lewis, Newfoundland and Labrador, Canada.

References

Certified airports in Newfoundland and Labrador